The Knock of Alves is a small wooded hill that lies  to the west of Elgin in Moray, Scotland, rising to  above ordnance datum. Its summit is marked by York Tower, a 3-storey octagonal folly erected in 1827 to commemorate Prince Frederick, the Duke of York; and the Forteath Mausoleum, built in 1850 as the burial place of 7 members of the Forteath family of the nearby house of Newton.

The hill is the site of a hill fort with evidence of both Iron Age and Pictish occupation. It is traditionally believed that there was an early Christian church, possibly Culdean, on top of the hill, though no traces of this have been found.

Hill fort
The hill is the site of a hill fort commonly classed as a member of a group that also includes Craig Phadrig and Knock Farril to the west  and Tap o' Noth and Dunnideer to the south east. These are characterised as massively constructed oblong forts, commonly exhibiting evidence of vitrification. The remains of the fort are now heavily mutilated and defaced and have been damaged by the building of the tower and mausoleum; by erosion from the provision of access roads; by root damage, animal burrowing and slope wash.

The fort was surveyed by the Royal Commission on the Ancient and Historical Monuments of Scotland in 1957. The entrance to both enclosures lay on the east, and the smaller enclosure may therefore have been a later structure built over the ruins of the larger one. A third wall surrounded both inner enclosures and was represented only by tumbled stones to the east and north, but by a more substantial scarp studded with stones and boulders to the west and south.

Two outer ramparts run around the lower slopes of the hill.

Excavations in 2016 revealed postholes in the upper citadel containing deposits dating from 400-200 BC and 520-370 BC, while the lower ramparts around the base of the hill contained deposits dating from 330-540 AD. This suggests that the site was occupied during the Iron Age, but then reoccupied and refortified between the later 4th and early 6th centuries during the early medieval period.

Gallery

References

Hill forts in Scotland
Vitrified forts in Scotland
Stone circles in Moray
Iron Age sites in Scotland
Pictish sites in Scotland
Archaeological sites in Moray